Cricket was one of the 36 sports at 2014 Asian Games held in Incheon, South Korea from 20 September to 3 October 2014. Both Men's and Women's tournaments were held in the event. Top Asian associate members and full members took part at the 2014 Asian Games. The matches were played under Twenty20 format.

In the men's event, Sri Lanka won the gold medal by defeating Afghanistan by 68 runs. Bangladesh won the bronze medal by defeating Hong Kong.

In the women's event, Pakistan won the gold medal by defeating Bangladesh by 4 runs in a rain-reduced match. Sri Lanka won the bronze medal by defeating China.

Schedule

Medalists

Medal table

Draw

Men
The two Test teams (Bangladesh and Sri Lanka) and two ODI teams (Afghanistan and Hong Kong) were seeded and went directly to the knock-out stage.

Group A

Group B

Quarterfinals
 vs. 2nd Group B
 vs. 2nd Group A
 vs. 1st Group B
 vs. 1st Group A

Women
The two Test teams (Pakistan and Sri Lanka), an ODI team Bangladesh, and Japan (who won the bronze medal in the 2010 Asian Games) were seeded and went directly to the knock-out stage.

Group C
*

Group D
*

* China replaced Thailand in Group C.

Quarterfinals
 vs. 2nd Group D
 vs. 2nd Group C
 vs. 1st Group D
 vs. 1st Group C

Final standing

Men

Women

References

 
2014
2014 Asian Games events
Asian Games
2014 Asian Games